Harbour.Space University also known as Harbour.Space, is a private uncredited university for technology, entrepreneurship, and design, with campuses in Barcelona, Spain and Bangkok, Thailand. Harbour.Space offers both bachelor's and master's degrees accredited through its partnership with UTCC (University of the Thai Chamber of Commerce).

History 
Harbour.Space was founded in 2015 by Svetlana Velikanova, and Ingo Beyer von Morgenstern, with its first campus in Barcelona, Spain. Upon opening in September 2016  at the OneOcean Port Vell, the university accepted 30 students from 11 countries. The current Harbour.Space campus is located in Carrer Rosa Sensat 9-11.

In August 2016, Harbour.Space signed an agreement of collaboration with the Moscow Institute of Physics and Technology, to develop academic exchange programs for students and staff, providing mutual administrative, operational and methodological support in the area of competitive programming and the organisation and realisation of joint educational, scientific, cultural events.

Also in 2016, Harbour.Space began a collaboration with Barcelona Activa. They collaborate in organising international programming bootcamps and free public lectures from the university’s faculty members. Barcelona Activa has supported Harbour.Space’s integration into the BCN ecosystem by collaborating with them on events and joint projects.

In 2017, Harbour.Space announced a collaboration with the programming platform Codeforces.

In February 2019, Harbour.Space and the University of the Thai Chamber of Commerce signed an agreement with Harbour.Space to open Harbour.Space@UTCC, the university’s Bangkok-based second campus. UTCC has a student base of 20,000 students on campus and an affiliation with the Thai Chamber of Commerce.

In 2021 the Harbour.Space team RAW POTS, composed of Maksym Oboznyi from Ukraine, Marco Meijer from the Netherlands, and Danil Zashikhin from Russia, won the gold medal at the SWERC against the top competitors from Southwestern Europe.  The Southwestern Europe Regional Contest, also known as SWERC, is the south-western Europe selection of the International Collegiate Programming Contest. Teams of three students compete in a 5-hour-long contest where they have to solve algorithmic problems and do practical coding.

Campuses 
Harbour.Space Barcelona opened its doors in September 2016, in OneOcean Port Vell. The university remained and operated from the marina until 2018 when it moved to its current location in Port Olimpic near the 22@ Innovation District of Barcelona and walking distance from Nova Icaria beach.

Harbour.Space@UTCC launched in January 2020 on UTCC’s premises, with bachelor and master programs in High-tech Entrepreneurship, Interaction Design, and Digital Marketing.

Academics 
Harbour.Space University offers both bachelor's and master's degrees. Its programmes are:

 Computer Science
 Data Science
 Cyber Security
 Interaction Design
 Digital Marketing
 Fintech
 Front-end Development
 Super Cities
 Math as a Second Language
 High-Tech Entrepreneurship 
 Product Management

Harbour.Space's programs are taught in English to up to 200 undergraduate, graduate and professional students per year. The Harbour.Space faculty is composed of professionals in their disciplines and instructors with current careers in the technology industry from around the world. Founding instructors include entrepreneur Kamran Elahian, chairman of venture capital firm Global Catalyst Partners.

Teaching methods 
Programmes at Harbour.Space run for an entire calendar year divided into fifteen 3-week modules. Each module is taught by industry leaders.

Scholarships 
The university offers scholarship opportunities; merit-based, women in technology, graduate teaching assistantships and competitive programming. These scholarships are available for the university’s Bangkok and Barcelona campuses.

Events

Hello Programming Bootcamp 
In 2017, Harbour.Space collaborated with Moscow Workshops and Codeforces to organize the Hello Barcelona Programming Bootcamp, the first edition in the series of bootcamps to prepare participants for the Intercollegiate Programming Competition World Finals. As of 2020, the Bootcamp series has continued, realizing 5 bootcamps in total in Spain, India, and Oman. The latest edition was scheduled to take place in Muscat, Oman, but was postponed due to the outbreak of COVID-19.

Tech Scouts 
In July 2018, Harbour.Space organised the first Tech Scouts, an 11-day summer camp for kids 12-18 with the objective of introducing them to design, computer science, and entrepreneurship. The camp had 62 participants. In July 2019, the university organised the second edition of the summer camp. The camp had 71 participants. The third edition of Tech Scouts was scheduled for July 2020 but was postponed because of the outbreak of COVID-19.

References

External links 
 
 Harbour.Space Robotics Page

2015 establishments in Catalonia
Schools in Barcelona
Universities and colleges in Spain
Educational institutions established in 2015